La quinceañera  is a documentary film produced and directed by Adam Taub released in 2007.  It was shot in Tijuana, Mexico and follows Ana Maria and her family as they prepare for and celebrate her qinceañera. The quinceañera or quince años (sometimes represented XV Años, meaning "fifteen years") is, in some Spanish-speaking regions of the Americas, a young woman's celebration of her fifteenth birthday, which is celebrated in a unique and different way from her other birthdays. The word is also used to refer to the young woman whose 15th birthday is being celebrated (analogous to the word cumpleañera for "birthday girl").

Reception
La quinceañera  won the "Outstanding Documentary Award" at the 2007 Angelus Student Film Festival and the San Diego Latino Film Festival Award for Best Student Documentary.

A reviewer for Críticas magazine called the film a "fine introduction" to the quinceañera rite.  A reviewer for Reel Talk called the film sensitive and revealing.

Awards 
 2007 Angelus Student Film Festival Award for Best Documentary
 2008 San Diego Latino Film Festival Award for Best Student Documentary

References

External links 
 La quinceañera documentary website
 

2007 films
American short documentary films
Films shot in Tijuana
2007 short documentary films
2000s Spanish-language films
Documentary films about adolescence
Documentary films about Mexico
2000s American films